Antoni Caba i Casamitjana (1838 – 25 January 1907) was a Spanish painter who worked in the Realistic style and is best known for his portraits.

Biography 
Antoni Caba was born in Barcelona. He attended the Escola de la Llotja during the 1850s, where he studied with Pau Milà i Fontanals and Claudi Lorenzale. Supported by a stipend from the school board, he later attended the Real Academia de Bellas Artes de San Fernando in Madrid, where his primary instructor was Federico de Madrazo. His first exhibition came in 1864, at the National Exhibition of Fine Arts. The government bought one of his works for the collection of the Museo del Prado.

For a short time, he was enrolled at the Académie des Beaux-Arts in Paris, where he studied under the direction of the Swiss painter, Charles Gleyre. In 1874, he obtained a teaching position as "Professor of Color and Composition" at the Escola and served as the Director from 1887 to 1901.  During this time, he dedicated himself to creating portraits for middle-class clients in Catalonia; especially Barcelona, for which he received the nickname "fotográficos".

In addition to his portraits, he created decorative murals in the Gran Teatro del Liceo and several private residences. He died in Barcelona on January 25, 1907.

References

Further reading 
 DDAA, La col•lecció Raimon Casellas, (1992), Publicacions del MNAC/Museo del Prado 
 Montserrat Gumà, Guia del Museu Nacional d'Art de Catalunya (2004), Publicacions del MNAC 
 Francesc Fontbona and Victoria Durá, Catàleg del Museu de la Reial Acadèmia Catalana de Belles Arts de Sant Jordi. I- Pintura (1999), Reial Acadèmia Catalana de Belles Arts de Sant Jordi

External links 

 Catálogo de la Acadèmia de Sant Jordi: Portal to works by Caba

1838 births
1907 deaths
Painters from Catalonia
Portrait painters
People from Barcelona
19th-century Spanish painters
Spanish male painters
Real Academia de Bellas Artes de San Fernando alumni
19th-century Spanish male artists